The International Department of the Central Committee of the Communist Party of the Soviet Union was a department of the Central Committee of the Communist Party of the Soviet Union that oversaw the Party's relationships with foreign Communist Parties as well as with international communist front organizations.

History
It inherited the files and some of the personnel of the Communist International, which disbanded in 1943. The International Department was found in 1943 at roughly the same time as the Comintern's dissolution.

The Party's relations with international front groups was managed by the Department's International Social Organizations Sector.

Leadership
1943, 27 December –  1945, 29 December: Georgi Dimitrov
1946, 13 April – 1949, 12 March: Mikhail Suslov
1949–1953: Vagan Grigorievich Grigoryan
1953–1954: Mikhail Suslov
1954–1955: Vasily Pavlovich Stepanov
1955–1986: Boris Ponomarev (the first deputy director from 1938 to 1955, deputy director of the Cominform from 1947 to 1948)
1986-1988: Anatoly Dobrynin
1988-1991: Valentin Falin

See also
 Departments of the Communist Party of the Soviet Union

References

See also 
International Department of the Central Committee of the Communist Party of China

Central Committee of the Communist Party of the Soviet Union
Foreign relations of the Soviet Union
Organizations established in 1943
1943 establishments in the Soviet Union